Cedar Island is one of the Elizabeth Islands between Monohansett Island and Nonamesset Island. The island has been known as Cedar Island due to the profusion of small cedars that grow on it. On 1911 C&GS Charts it is named "East Buck Island".

References

Gosnold, Massachusetts
Coastal islands of Massachusetts
Elizabeth Islands
Islands of Dukes County, Massachusetts